A number of vessels have been named Armorique, including:

, in service 1975–93
, in service

Ship names